Opinion polling was commissioned throughout the duration of the 47th New Zealand Parliament and in the lead up to the 2005 election by various organisations.

Party vote and key events in the leadup to the 2005 election
Refusals are generally excluded from the party vote percentages, while question wording and the treatment of "don't know" responses and those not intending to vote may vary between survey firms.

Graphical summary

Individual polls

See also
2005 New Zealand general election
Politics of New Zealand

References

2005
2005 New Zealand general election
New Zealand